The 1996 United States presidential election in Kentucky took place on November 5, 1996, as part of the 1996 United States presidential election. Voters chose 8 representatives, or electors to the Electoral College, who voted for president and vice president.

Kentucky was won by President Bill Clinton (D) over Senator Bob Dole (R-KS), with Clinton winning 45.84% to 44.88% by a slim margin of 0.96%. Billionaire businessman Ross Perot (Reform-TX) finished in third, with 8.67% of the popular vote.

, this is the last time that the Democratic nominee carried Kentucky, as well as Powell County, Montgomery County, Nicholas County, Lawrence County, Bourbon County, Nelson County, Simpson County, McCracken County, Hopkins County, Calloway County, Graves County, Greenup County, Clark County, Marshall County, Meade County, Bell County, Logan County, Ohio County, Johnson County, Marion County, Harrison County, Henry County, Union County, Trigg County, Morgan County, Webster County, Caldwell County, Martin County, Carroll County, McLean County, Livingston County, Trimble County, Gallatin County, Lyon County, Carlisle County, and Hickman County. In fact, Republicans have carried the Bluegrass State by double-digits in every subsequent election, with the party's margin of victory almost exclusively increasing in the 21st century. This is also the last time that Kentucky would vote to the left of Colorado, North Carolina, Georgia, and neighboring Virginia.

Results

By county

See also
United States Senate election in Kentucky, 1996

References

Kentucky
1996
1996 Kentucky elections